Flax serami is a moth of the family Erebidae first described by Michael Fibiger in 2011. It is found in Indonesia (Seram).

The wingspan is about 11 mm. The forewings have a costa which is shorter than the posterior margin. The forewings have a white beige ground colour and a brown terminal area, including the fringes. The base of the costa is dark brown. There is a dark brown quadrangular patch in the upper medial area, with a black dot in inner lower area. The crosslines are brown, except for the terminal line which is only indicated by black-brown interveinal dots. The hindwings are grey. The underside of the forewings is unicolorous light brown and the underside of the hindwings is grey with a discal spot.

References

Micronoctuini
Moths described in 2011
Taxa named by Michael Fibiger